Vijay Chavan (2 May 1955 – 24 August 2018) was an Indian film, television and stage actor, notable for his work in Marathi and Hindi cinema.

He was best known for his role of Mavshi in the famous Marathi Stage drama "Moruchi Mavshi". This comedy play was written by Pralhad Keshav Atre.  He died on 24 August 2018 in Mumbai at the age of 63.

Filmography
He has appeared in many Marathi movies including Mumbaicha Dabewala (2007), Shrimanta Damodar Panta and Sasu Cha Swayamwar (2015).

References

External links

1955 births
2018 deaths
Indian male film actors
Male actors in Marathi cinema
Male actors in Marathi theatre
Male actors from Mumbai
Deaths from lung disease